Gladys Milton Palmer, Dayang Muda of Sarawak, also known as Khair-ul-Nissa and Khair un-nisa binti 'Abdu'llah, (8 January 1884 – 12 June 1952) was a British film producer and heiress. Through her marriage to Bertram Willes Dayrell Brooke, she was a member of the ruling dynasty of Sarawak.

Biography

Early life and family 
Palmer was born on 8 January 1884 into a prominent Quaker family. She was the only child of Sir Walter Palmer, 1st Baronet and Jean Craig. Her paternal grandfather was George Palmer, a proprietor of Huntley & Palmers. Her maternal grandfather was the engineer and politician William Young Craig. She was a niece of George William Palmer and a great-niece of William Isaac Palmer.

Marriage and issue 
On 28 June 1904 Palmer married Bertram Willes Dayrell Brooke, the son of Charles Brooke, Rajah of Sarawak and Margaret de Windt. Through this marriage she became a member of the ruling dynasty of the Raj of Sarawak. After her father-in-law died in 1917, her husband's older brother, Charles Vyner Brooke, succeeded the throne. Her husband was made heir presumptive and accorded the title Tuan Muda of Sarawak and style of Highness. As the wife of the Tuan Muda, Palmer was accorded the title Dayang Muda and the style of Highness.

Palmer and Brooke had four children:
Jean Margaret Palmer Brooke
Elizabeth Brooke
Anne Elaine Primula Brooke
Anthony Walter Dayrell Brooke

Career 
In 1922 Palmer formed a film company called Big Four Famous Productions Company. She produced one film, Potter's Clay which featured the actress Dame Alice Ellen Terry.

Later life and death 
In 1932 Palmer converted from Christianity to Islam. Stating that she wished her "conversion to be performed on no earthly territory", she chartered an Imperial Airways 42-seat airliner to fly from Croydon Airport to Paris. Another British Muslim convert, Khalid Sheldrake, conducted the ceremony over the English Channel. Sheldrake gave her the Arabic name "Khair-ul-Nissa" ("fairest of women") or "Khair un-nisa binti 'Abdu'llah".

Palmer died on 12 June 1952 and was buried at St Leonard's in Sheepstor, Devon.

References 

1884 births
1952 deaths
British film production company founders
British women film producers
British former Christians
British Muslims
Converts to Islam from Protestantism
Former Quakers
Daughters of baronets
Gladys Milton
Princesses by marriage
Sarawak royalty